Igołomia  is a village in the administrative district of Gmina Igołomia-Wawrzeńczyce, within Kraków County, Lesser Poland Voivodeship, in southern Poland.

The village has a population of 1,100.

Notable people
 Albert Chmielowski, painter, Catholic Saint
 Wincenty Wodzinowski, painter

References

Villages in Kraków County
Kielce Governorate
Kielce Voivodeship (1919–1939)